Scott Martlew (born 23 September 1992) is a New Zealand Para canoeist from Christchurch, New Zealand, who represented his country at the 2016 and 2020 Summer Paralympics.

Paralympic Games performances 
Scott was the first Kiwi to represent New Zealand in Para canoe at the Paralympic Games. He debuted at the Rio 2016 Paralympic Games, becoming New Zealand Paralympian #198. Scott placed 8th in the Men’s 200m KL3. He was selected again for the Tokyo 2020 Paralympic Games, where he narrowly missed the podium, placing 4th in the Men’s 200m KL2. He also placed 8th in the Men’s 200m VL3 in Para va'a (outrigger canoe).

World Championships performances 
Scott won a silver medal at the 2018 ICF Canoe Sprint World Championships, a bronze medal at the 2019 ICF Canoe Sprint World Championships, and a bronze medal at the 2022 ICF Canoe Sprint and Para Canoe World Championships.

References

External links
 
 
 

1992 births
Living people
New Zealand male canoeists
Paracanoeists of New Zealand
Paracanoeists at the 2016 Summer Paralympics
Paracanoeists at the 2020 Summer Paralympics
ICF Canoe Sprint World Championships medalists in paracanoe